Renato Bracci (8 September 1904 in Livorno – 2 March 1975) was an Italian rower who competed in the 1932 Summer Olympics.

In 1932 he won the silver medal as member of the Italian boat in the men's eight competition.

References

External links
 profile

1904 births
1975 deaths
Sportspeople from Livorno
Italian male rowers
Olympic rowers of Italy
Rowers at the 1932 Summer Olympics
Olympic silver medalists for Italy
Olympic medalists in rowing
Medalists at the 1932 Summer Olympics
European Rowing Championships medalists